Love Marriage is a Hindi-language television series that aired on Zee TV channel in 2002. The series highlights the interesting relations in an urban society. The series is an Indian version of American television series Sex and the City.

Synopsis
A story told through 4 beautiful young women, who driven by circumstances, land up in Bombay in the hope of realising their dreams, "Love Marriage". They start to live together making adjustments and compromises they hadn’t planned for. As they begin to settle, their professional lives take off in different directions. However, when the line between their professional and personal lives starts to blur, the real drama begins.

Cast
 Aditi Pratap as Anu
 Kanchan Mirchandani as Meera
 Sheeba Chadha as Sonali
 Tisca Chopra as Kiran
 Apara Mehta as Mrs. Dixit 
 Mamik Singh as Ravi Shah 
 Kushal Punjabi
 Atul Kumar
 Pracheen Chauhan
 Tuhina Vohra
 Meghna Malik
 Sunil Mattoo
 Shashi Puri
 Aamir Dalvi
 Sanjay Gandhi
 Rahul Vora
 Raman Trikha

References 

Indian television soap operas
Zee TV original programming
2002 Indian television series debuts
2002 Indian television series endings